The Meso-American slider (Trachemys venusta) is a species of turtle belonging to the family Emydidae. The species is distributed from Mexico to Colombia.

Geographic range
The species Trachemys venusta is found from southeastern Mexico to northwestern Colombia.

Trachemys venusta venusta – Belize, Guatemala, Honduras, and Mexico in the states of Campeche, Chiapas, Oaxaca, Quintana Roo, Tabasco, Veracruz, and Yucatán
Trachemys venusta cataspila – Mexico in the states of San Luis Potosí, Tamaulipas, and Veracruz
Trachemys venusta grayi – El Salvador, Guatemala and Mexico in the states of Chiapas and Oaxaca

The following three new subspecies were described in 2010.

Trachemys venusta iversoni – Mexico in the state of Yucatán
Trachemys venusta panamensis – Panama
Trachemys venusta uhrigi – Costa Rica, Honduras, Nicaragua, Panama, and Colombia in the departments of Antioquia and Chocó

Subspecies
Trachemys venusta venusta  – Belize slider 
Trachemys venusta cataspila  – Huastecan slider
Trachemys venusta grayi  – Gray's slider
Trachemys venusta iversoni  – Yucatán slider
Trachemys venusta panamensis  – Panamanian slider
Trachemys venusta uhrigi  – Uhrig's slider

Nota bene: A trinomial authority in parentheses indicates that the subspecies was originally described in a genus other than Trachemys.

Etymology
The subspecific name, grayi, is in honor of British herpetologist John Edward Gray.

References

Bibliography

Further reading
Campbell, Jonathan A. (1998). Amphibians and Reptiles of Northern Guatemala, the Yucatán, and Belize. Norman, Oklahoma: University of Oklahoma Press. 400 pp. . pp. 114–115.

External links

Trachemys
Turtles of North America
Reptiles of Belize
Reptiles of Colombia
Reptiles of Costa Rica
Reptiles of El Salvador
Reptiles of Guatemala
Reptiles of Honduras
Reptiles of Mexico
Reptiles of Panama
Reptiles of Nicaragua
Reptiles described in 1856
Taxa named by John Edward Gray